This is a list of cricketers called for throwing in top-class cricket matches in Australia. In the sport of cricket, strict rules govern the method of bowling the ball. The rules relate to the bending of the arm at the elbow, the extent of which has always been open to interpretation by the umpires. More recently, the International Cricket Council has attempted to codify the maximum permissible flexing of the elbow as 15 degrees.

When a player is found by the umpire to have delivered the ball contrary to those rules, the umpire will call a no-ball and he is said to have been called for throwing. Where public opinion is that a player's bowling action appears to be that he routinely throws, he is said to have a 'suspect' or an 'illegal' action, or more derogatorily, is said to be a 'chucker'. The issue is often highly emotive with accusers considering that deliveries with an illegal action are akin to cheating.

Over the years, a number of players have been called in top-class matches – Test matches, One Day Internationals and domestic first-class matches – invariably creating controversy and occasionally destroying cricket careers. Often the player has been able to modify his action to appease his critics and the umpires, but more commonly, especially when the bowler has been called on more than one occasion, his career in international cricket is effectively ended.

List of players called for throwing
Note: Entries marked with blue backgrounds were called for throwing in a Test match or One Day International (ODI) played in Australia.

See also
List of international cricketers called for throwing

References

General

Specific

Further reading

Cricket controversies
Lists of Australian cricketers